This is a list of episodes of the American animated television series Baby Looney Tunes.

Series overview

Episodes

Season 1 (2002)

Season 2 (2002)

Season 3 (2002)

Film (2003)

Season 4 (2005)

Baby Looney Tunes
Lists of Cartoon Network television series episodes